Miltondale is an unincorporated community in Clay County, in the U.S. state of Missouri.

History
A post office called Miltondale was established in 1895, and remained in operation until 1906. The community most likely derives its name from Milton Moore, an early settler.

References

Unincorporated communities in Clay County, Missouri
Unincorporated communities in Missouri